Frank Sheptock (born November 27, 1963) is an American football coach and former player. He is the head football coach at Bloomsburg University of Pennsylvania, a position he assumed in December 2019. Sheptock played college football as a linebacker at Bloomsburg, where he set the school record for most tackles in a game (23) and most career tackles (537). Sheptock served as the head football coach at Wilkes University in Wilkes-Barre, Pennsylvania from 1996 to 2013, compiling a record of 107–81.  He was the head football coach at Berwick Area Senior High School in Berwick, Pennsylvania from 2016 to 2018, tallying a mark of 27–11. Sheptock was inducted into the College Football Hall of Fame as a player in 2007.

Head coaching record

College

References

External links
 Bloomsburg profile
 Wilkes profile
 

1963 births
Living people
American football linebackers
Bloomsburg Huskies football coaches
Bloomsburg Huskies football players
Misericordia Cougars football coaches
Wilkes Colonels football coaches
High school football coaches in Pennsylvania
College Football Hall of Fame inductees
People from Shamokin, Pennsylvania
Coaches of American football from Pennsylvania
Players of American football from Pennsylvania